Pol Freixanet Viejo (born 22 August 1991) is a Spanish footballer who plays as a goalkeeper.

Club career
Born in Manresa, Barcelona, Catalonia, Pol graduated with RCD Espanyol's youth setup. In the 2010 summer he moved to Málaga CF, being initially assigned to the reserves in Tercera División.

On 25 January 2012 Pol renewed with the Andalusians, signing until 2014. On 14 July of the following year he was loaned to Segunda División B side Real Oviedo, appearing regularly.

On 9 July 2014 Pol moved to another reserve team, Elche CF Ilicitano in the third level. On 23 May 2015 he made his first team – and La Liga – debut for the latter, coming on as a late substitute for injured Przemysław Tytoń in a 0–0 away draw against Levante UD.

Pol was definitely promoted to the main squad in August 2015, mainly due to squad shortage. He was demoted to third-choice at the start of the 2016–17 season, behind Juan Carlos and Germán Parreño.

On 29 December 2016, after making no appearances during the first half of the campaign, Pol moved to CF Fuenlabrada in the third tier. On 3 July 2018, he signed a three-year contract with second division side CF Reus Deportiu, but halfway through the campaign, he left the club after it was expelled by the LFP.

On 23 July 2019, Pol returned to Fuenla, with the club now in the second division.

References

External links

1991 births
Living people
Footballers from Manresa
Spanish footballers
Association football goalkeepers
La Liga players
Segunda División players
Segunda División B players
Tercera División players
Atlético Malagueño players
Real Oviedo players
Elche CF Ilicitano footballers
Elche CF players
CF Fuenlabrada footballers
CF Reus Deportiu players